Clarkton Bridge was a historic Pratt truss bridge located over the Staunton River near Nathalie, in Charlotte County, Virginia. It was built in 1902 by the Virginia Bridge & Iron Co., and was the only remaining metal truss structure in Virginia built for highway purposes, which was supported by steel cylinder piers. It consisted of two camelback, pin-connected steel through truss channel spans, and twelve steel deck beam approach spans. The overall dimensions of the bridge approach and truss spans were as follows: north approach,  with twelve deck spans; north truss, ; south truss, .

The bridge was listed on the National Register of Historic Places in 2006. It was demolished in October 2018 by the J. B. Fay Company of Pittsburgh, Pennsylvania.

See also
List of bridges documented by the Historic American Engineering Record in Virginia
List of bridges on the National Register of Historic Places in Virginia

References

External links

Road bridges on the National Register of Historic Places in Virginia
Bridges completed in 1902
Buildings and structures in Charlotte County, Virginia
National Register of Historic Places in Charlotte County, Virginia
Historic American Engineering Record in Virginia
Steel bridges in the United States
Pratt truss bridges in the United States